Pioneer Valley Zendo is a Soto Zen zendo established in 1976 in Charlemont, Massachusetts, United States, as a sister-temple to Antai-ji in Japan, where Kosho Uchiyama was rōshi.

History
In 1974, Steve Yenik and Koshi Ichida arrived from Japan and began raising funds to create a zendo in the forest hills near the Vermont border. Ichida was joined by Eishin Ikeda and Shohaku Okumura. Reverend Issho Fujita was the resident teacher from 1987 until 2005. Eishin Ikeda, who later led the Bean Town Sangha (founded by Eishin Ikeda and Michael Flessas) whose first meetings were held on the second floor of a book store in Arlington, Massachusetts, returned as the present resident priest in 2006.

See also
Timeline of Zen Buddhism in the United States

References

External links
 Valley Zendo

Buddhist organizations based in the United States
Buddhist temples in Massachusetts
Japanese-American culture in Massachusetts
Buddhism in Massachusetts
Zen centers in the United States